Hyderabad Electric Supply Company or HESCO is an electric distribution company that supplies electricity to the southern districts of Sindh in Pakistan, excluding Karachi.

Muzafar Abbasi  is the CEO of the company since 31 December 2022.

Formation of the company
Hyderabad had an Area Electricity Board (AEB) as one of the eight AEBs constituted through amendments in WAPDA Act during 1981. Later on, as the Government of Pakistan approved the revamping of the Water and Power Development Authority (WAPDA) power sector in April 1998, the Hyderabad Electric Supply Company took over responsibilities of the Hyderabad Area Electricity Board. Hyderabad Electric Supply Company is owned and operated by WAPDA though. The company was incorporated on 23 April 1998 and certificate for commencement of business was obtained on 1 July 1998 from NEPRA under section 146(2) of Companies Ordinance 1984.

As a result of revamping, 12 corporate entities, 8 distribution companies (DISCOs), 3 generation companies (GENSCOs) and 1 National Transmission and Dispatch Company  (NTDC) company were formed. Under 8 DISCOs, Area Electricity Board (AEB) Hyderabad was one of them. Therefore, HESCO - Hyderabad Electric Supply Company came in to formation. Formerly known as Area Electricity Board (AEBH) Hyderabad.

See also 

 List of electric supply companies in Pakistan

References

External links
 Hyderabad Electric Supply Company
 HESCO Bill Online site
Distribution companies of Pakistan
Hyderabad District, Pakistan
Government-owned companies of Pakistan